Ramon López Suárez, known as Moncho López (born 10 July 1969 in Ferrol), is a Galician basketball manager and the current coach of FC Porto and the Angola national basketball team.

Coach career
López coached Baloncesto Galicia Ferrol (1995–1997) and Gijón Baloncesto (1998–2002), before taking office as the coach of Spain, which he guided to a silver medal at the EuroBasket 2003. After a brief spell at CB Sevilla, he was sacked after finishing 13th in the ACB. He was without a club when he was hired to coach the Portugal national basketball team, in January 2008. Portugal failed the direct qualification for the EuroBasket 2009, as well as the final play-offs. The team's performance at the EuroBasket 2011 qualification round lead to his dismissal from office.

Before leaving Portugal national team, he cumulated the coaching position in FC Porto since 2009.

On 10 February 2015 Moncho López was appointed head coach of the Angola national team for the 2015 AfroBasket, where he won the bronze medal. He left office in August 2015.

References

External links
Profile at ACB.com

1969 births
Living people
Spanish basketball coaches
Liga ACB head coaches
Gijón Baloncesto coaches
FC Porto basketball coaches